Pink is a 2011 South Korean drama film directed by Jeon Soo-il.

Cast
 Seo Gap-sook as Ok-ryeon
 Lee Seung-yeon as Soo-jin
 Park Hyeon-woo as Sang-kook
 Kang San-eh as a wanderer
 Lee Won-jong as Kyeong-soo, a policeman

References

External links

2011 films
2011 drama films
South Korean independent films
South Korean drama films
Films directed by Jeon Soo-il
2010s Korean-language films
2011 independent films
2010s South Korean films